Abdul Amir Sabri (born 1964) is an Iraqi former international football player, who played for Iraq in the 1988 Gulf Cup of Nations.

Honors

Local
Salahaddin
Iraqi League : 1982–83

International
Iraq
 Gulf Cup of Nations :  1988

References

External links
  A report for the 1988 Gulf Cup of Nations
Al-Minaa Club: Sailors of south

1964 births
Living people
Association football forwards
Iraqi footballers
Al-Mina'a SC players
Al-Bahri players
Sportspeople from Basra
Iraq international footballers